Franklin Township may refer to the following places in the United States:

Arkansas
 Franklin Township, Carroll County, Arkansas
 Franklin Township, Desha County, Arkansas, in Desha County, Arkansas
 Franklin Township, Drew County, Arkansas, in Drew County, Arkansas
 Franklin Township, Grant County, Arkansas, in Grant County, Arkansas
 Franklin Township, Howard County, Arkansas, in Howard County, Arkansas
 Franklin Township, Izard County, Arkansas, in Izard County, Arkansas
 Franklin Township, Little River County, Arkansas, in Little River County, Arkansas
 Franklin Township, Stone County, Arkansas, in Stone County, Arkansas
 Franklin Township, Union County, Arkansas, in Union County, Arkansas

Illinois
 Franklin Township, DeKalb County, Illinois

Indiana
 Franklin Township, DeKalb County, Indiana
 Franklin Township, Floyd County, Indiana
 Franklin Township, Grant County, Indiana
 Franklin Township, Harrison County, Indiana
 Franklin Township, Hendricks County, Indiana
 Franklin Township, Henry County, Indiana
 Franklin Township, Johnson County, Indiana
 Franklin Township, Kosciusko County, Indiana
 Franklin Township, Marion County, Indiana
 Franklin Township, Montgomery County, Indiana
 Franklin Township, Owen County, Indiana
 Franklin Township, Pulaski County, Indiana
 Franklin Township, Putnam County, Indiana
 Franklin Township, Randolph County, Indiana
 Franklin Township, Ripley County, Indiana
 Franklin Township, Washington County, Indiana
 Franklin Township, Wayne County, Indiana

Iowa
 Franklin Township, Allamakee County, Iowa
 Franklin Township, Appanoose County, Iowa
 Franklin Township, Bremer County, Iowa
 Franklin Township, Cass County, Iowa
 Franklin Township, Clarke County, Iowa
 Franklin Township, Decatur County, Iowa
 Franklin Township, Des Moines County, Iowa
 Franklin Township, Greene County, Iowa
 Franklin Township, Lee County, Iowa
 Franklin Township, Linn County, Iowa
 Franklin Township, Marion County, Iowa, in Marion County, Iowa
 Franklin Township, Monona County, Iowa
 Franklin Township, Monroe County, Iowa
 Franklin Township, O'Brien County, Iowa
 Franklin Township, Polk County, Iowa
 Franklin Township, Story County, Iowa
 Franklin Township, Washington County, Iowa

Kansas
 Franklin Township, Bourbon County, Kansas
 Franklin Township, Edwards County, Kansas
 Franklin Township, Franklin County, Kansas
 Franklin Township, Jackson County, Kansas
 Franklin Township, Lincoln County, Kansas, in Lincoln County, Kansas
 Franklin Township, Marshall County, Kansas, in Marshall County, Kansas
 Franklin Township, Ness County, Kansas, in Ness County, Kansas
 Franklin Township, Trego County, Kansas, in Trego County, Kansas
 Franklin Township, Washington County, Kansas, in Washington County, Kansas

Michigan
 Franklin Township, Clare County, Michigan
 Franklin Township, Houghton County, Michigan
 Franklin Township, Lenawee County, Michigan

Minnesota
 Franklin Township, Wright County, Minnesota

Missouri
 Franklin Township, Dent County, Missouri
 Franklin Township, Grundy County, Missouri
 Franklin Township, Howard County, Missouri
 Franklin Township, Laclede County, Missouri
 Franklin Township, Miller County, Missouri
 Franklin Township, Newton County, Missouri, in Newton County, Missouri

Nebraska
 Franklin Township, Butler County, Nebraska
 Franklin Township, Fillmore County, Nebraska

New Jersey
 Franklin Township, Bergen County, New Jersey, historical
 Franklin Township, Essex County, New Jersey, now the township of Nutley
 Franklin Township, Gloucester County, New Jersey
 Franklin Township, Hunterdon County, New Jersey
 Franklin Township, Somerset County, New Jersey
 Franklin Township, Warren County, New Jersey

North Carolina
 Franklin Township, Rowan County, North Carolina
 Franklin Township, Surry County, North Carolina

Ohio
Franklin Township, Adams County, Ohio
Franklin Township, Brown County, Ohio
Franklin Township, Clermont County, Ohio
Franklin Township, Columbiana County, Ohio
Franklin Township, Coshocton County, Ohio
Franklin Township, Darke County, Ohio
Franklin Township, Franklin County, Ohio
Franklin Township, Fulton County, Ohio
Franklin Township, Harrison County, Ohio
Franklin Township, Jackson County, Ohio
Franklin Township, Licking County, Ohio
Franklin Township, Mercer County, Ohio
Franklin Township, Monroe County, Ohio
Franklin Township, Morrow County, Ohio
Franklin Township, Portage County, Ohio
Franklin Township, Richland County, Ohio
Franklin Township, Ross County, Ohio
Franklin Township, Shelby County, Ohio
Franklin Township, Summit County, Ohio, now the city of New Franklin
Franklin Township, Tuscarawas County, Ohio
Franklin Township, Warren County, Ohio
Franklin Township, Wayne County, Ohio

Pennsylvania
 Franklin Township, Adams County, Pennsylvania
 Franklin Township, Beaver County, Pennsylvania
 Franklin Township, Bradford County, Pennsylvania
 Franklin Township, Butler County, Pennsylvania
 Franklin Township, Carbon County, Pennsylvania
 Franklin Township, Chester County, Pennsylvania
 Franklin Township, Columbia County, Pennsylvania
 Franklin Township, Erie County, Pennsylvania
 Franklin Township, Fayette County, Pennsylvania
 Franklin Township, Greene County, Pennsylvania
 Franklin Township, Huntingdon County, Pennsylvania
 Franklin Township, Luzerne County, Pennsylvania
 Franklin Township, Lycoming County, Pennsylvania
 Franklin Township, Snyder County, Pennsylvania
 Franklin Township, Susquehanna County, Pennsylvania
 Franklin Township, York County, Pennsylvania

North Dakota
 Franklin Township, Steele County, North Dakota, in Steele County, North Dakota

South Dakota
 Franklin Township, Jerauld County, South Dakota, in Jerauld County, South Dakota
 Franklin Township, Lake County, South Dakota, in Lake County, South Dakota

Township name disambiguation pages